Sri Maddi Anjaneya Swamy Temple is  an ancient holy temple and a popular pilgrim center in Andhra Pradesh of South India. This temple is 51 km from Eluru, the headquarters of West Godavari District[Jangareddygudem].

References

External links

Hindu temples in West Godavari district
Hanuman temples